Milan Radović (Serbian Cyrillic: Милан Радовић, born 15 July 1952 in Titovo Užice, SFR Yugoslavia) is a Serbian striker who played for NK Rijeka and Stade Brestois.

Born in Titovo Užice (SR Serbia, SFR Yugoslavia) he begin playing with FK Radnički Pirot before moving to NK Rijeka where he became Yugoslav First League top goalscorer in 1980-81 with 26 goals. In 1981, he moved abroad to France where he joined Ligue 1 side Stade Brestois.

Honours
NK Rijeka
Yugoslav Cup: 1978, 1979
Balkans Cup: 1978

Individual
Yugoslav First League top scorer: 1980-81

Career statistics

References

External links
Susret za istoriju: Generacije Radničkog koje će se pamtiti!

1952 births
Living people
Sportspeople from Užice
Yugoslav footballers
Serbian footballers
Serbian expatriate footballers
Association football forwards
FK Radnički Pirot players
HNK Rijeka players
Yugoslav First League players
Ligue 1 players
Stade Brestois 29 players
Expatriate footballers in France